Yes Indeed!! is the fourth album by Ray Charles, released in 1958 by Atlantic. It was the second of three Atlantic LPs that compiled Charles' hit singles for the label. (See discography)

Ray Charles, Yes Indeed!! is also the title of the book and DVD tribute published in memory of Charles by his manager Joe Adams, The Ray Charles Marketing Group and Genesis Publications in 2009.

Track listing
All songs written by Ray Charles except as indicated.

Side One
"What Would I Do Without You?" – 2:32
"It's All Right" – 2:14
"I Want to Know" – 2:07
"Yes Indeed!!" (Sy Oliver) – 2:12
"Get On the Right Track Baby" (Titus Turner) – 2:19
"Talkin' 'bout You" – 2:48
"Swanee River Rock (Talkin' 'bout That River)" – 2:15

Side Two
"Lonely Avenue" (Doc Pomus) – 2:33
"Blackjack" – 2:17
"The Sun's Gonna Shine Again" (Sam Sweet) – 2:35
"I Had a Dream" – 2:51
"I Want a Little Girl" (Billy Moll, Murray Mencher) – 2:50
"Heartbreaker" (A. Nugetre) – 2:49
"Leave My Woman Alone" – 2:38

Personnel
Ray Charles - piano, vocals
Joshua Willis - trumpet (track 1)
Joe Bridgewater - trumpet (tracks 1, 6, 7, 9, 12)
John Hunt - trumpet (tracks 2, 3, 5, 8, 14)
Marcus Belgrave - trumpet (tracks 4, 11)
Lee Harper - trumpet (tracks 4, 11)
Ricky Harper - trumpet (tracks 6, 7, 12)
Charles Whitley - trumpet (track 9)
Jesse Drakes - trumpet (track 13)
Don Wilkerson - tenor saxophone (tracks 1, 9)
David Newman - tenor saxophone, alto saxophone (tracks 2, 3, 4, 5, 6, 7, 8, 11, 12, 14), baritone saxophone (track 9)
Sam Taylor - tenor saxophone (track 13)
Cecil Payne - baritone saxophone (track 1)
Emmet Dennis - baritone saxophone (tracks 2, 3, 4, 5, 6, 7, 8, 11, 12, 14)
Dave McRae - baritone saxophone (track 13)
Wesley Jackson - guitar (track 9)
Mickey Baker - guitar (track 13)
Paul West - bass (track 1)
Roosevelt Sheffield - bass  (tracks 2, 3, 5, 8, 14)
Edgar Willis - bass (tracks 4, 6, 7, 11, 12)
Jimmy Bell - bass (track 9)
Lloyd Trotman - bass (track 13)
Panama Francis - drums (track 1)
William Peeples - drums (tracks 2, 3, 5, 6, 7, 8, 12, 14)
Richie Goldberg - drums (tracks 4, 11)
Glenn Brooks - drums (track 9)
Connie Kay - drums (track 13)
The Cookies - vocals (tracks 3, 8, 14)
The Raelettes - vocals (tracks 6, 7, 12)
Mary Ann Fisher - vocals (tracks 6, 7, 12)
Technical
Marvin Israel - cover design

References

1958 albums
Ray Charles albums
Albums produced by Jerry Wexler
Albums produced by Ahmet Ertegun
Atlantic Records albums